Clinton School may refer to:

Clinton School of Public Service, a branch of the University of Arkansas
Clinton High School (disambiguation)
Clinton School District (disambiguation)
The Clinton School, a public middle and high school in New York City

See also
List of honors and awards received by Bill Clinton
List of places named for DeWitt Clinton